Armando Diaz was a light cruiser of the  and the sister-ship of the . She served in the Regia Marina during World War II. She was built by OTO, La Spezia, and named after Armando Diaz, an Italian Field Marshal of World War I.

She was launched on  29 April 1933 and served in the Mediterranean after her completion. From 1 September 1934 until February 1935 she made a cruise to Australia and New Zealand.

During the Spanish Civil War she served in the western Mediterranean and was based at Palma de Mallorca and Melilla.

In July 1940, she was present at the Battle of Calabria, also called the battle of Punta Stilo. In October she took part in a mission to Albania, and in December she came under direct orders of Supermarina (Naval Headquarters) for special duties in connection with the protection of traffic to Albania from January 1941. However, the following month an important supply convoy to Tripoli required her use for cover, in company with the light cruiser  and some destroyers.

It took the Italian cruiser only six minutes to sink after her magazine detonated, with the loss of 484 men.

Wreck
The wreck of Armando Diaz was located around 2009-2010. The ship lies on her port side in less than 50 meters of water, with her bow blown off. Her aft turrets are still in place, their guns buried in the bottom.

Citations

References

 

 

Cadorna-class cruisers
Ships built by OTO Melara
Ships built in La Spezia
1932 ships
World War II cruisers of Italy
Ships sunk by British submarines
World War II shipwrecks in the Mediterranean Sea
Maritime incidents in February 1941
Naval magazine explosions